Elections to Vale of White Horse District Council were held on 1 May 2003.  The whole council was up for election with boundary changes having taken place since the last election in 1999.  The Liberal Democrats lost seats, but stayed in overall control of the council.

Election Result

|}

Ward results

References

External links
Vale of White Horse Conservatives

2003
2003 English local elections
2000s in Oxfordshire